Carlton Town could refer to 

Carlton Town, North Yorkshire, a civil parish in North Yorkshire, England
Carlton Town F.C. a semi-professional football team in Nottinghamshire, England.

See also 
Carlton Township (disambiguation)